Marloes Bolman (born 8 November 1977) is a Dutch rower. She competed in the women's coxless pair event at the 2000 Summer Olympics.

References

External links
 

1977 births
Living people
Dutch female rowers
Olympic rowers of the Netherlands
Rowers at the 2000 Summer Olympics
Sportspeople from Friesland